Gigas is an international cloud computing services company based in Madrid, Spain. The company began as a start-up in 2011.
The company has data centers in Madrid and Miami, and offices in Spain, US, Colombia, Chile, Peru and Panama.

Gigas founding team, led by CEO Diego Cabezudo and COO José Antonio Arribas, is made up of former directors of technology and telecommunications companies in Europe.

Data Centers 
Gigas’ data centers are located in Madrid and Miami.  Gigas’ Madrid data center is housed in the Interxion collocation facility, which offers capacity for up to 80,000 servers, access to more than 50 carriers and ISPs, dual-entry fiber and SLA-based cross connects. Interxion is a multinational company with 61,000 m2 of technical space distributed across 34 facilities in 11 European countries. Its 18 neutral points allow for connection to 400 different carriers.

Gigas’ Miami installation is housed in Verizon Terremark’s flagship facility, the “NAP of the Americas.  The hub is the first purpose-built, carrier-neutral Network Access Point and is the only facility of its kind specifically designed to link Latin America with the rest of the world, facilitating about 90% of all Internet traffic going in and out of the region.  It has 70,000m2 of technical space and is one of the largest data centres in the world. It holds Tier IV classification, the highest possible industry certification.

Ownership 
Gigas is a private company founded in 2011 by five individuals in the communications and internet sector in Spain and internationally.  The project has the support of venture capital firms including Cabiedes & Partners, Bonsai Venture Capital and Caixa Capital Risc.

Growth 
Gigas has seen rapid growth since its founding in 2011. It has opened its offices in Bogota, Medellín, Santiago de Chile, Lima. and Panama. Gigas attributes its success in Spanish speaking markets to its local, culturally aware, in-language technical support offered by the company's in-house team of engineers and systems administrators.

References

Web services
Cloud computing providers
Cloud platforms